PES Society is an eSports organization founded in 2013, competing and promoting the Pro Evolution Soccer series. The organization as of January 2020 announced its affiliation to Mind Sports South Africa who is nationally recognized as the controlling body for eSports.

Brief History 
PES Society was constituted in 2013, however, it was not until November 2019 that the PES Society formed with a committee formally announced. When the organization started, the goal was just to host Pro Evolution Soccer tournaments due to a lack of them in and around Cape Town with the aim of showing players that there was a platform for Pro Evolution Soccer players to compete on. The goal was to do more within – and outside – the gaming community, to show the positive impact gaming was making within communities. As of January 2020 PES Society formed its office bearers and announced its very own constitution as part of its application to affiliate with Mind Sports South Africa.

Achievements 
PES Society has had members winning the below major Pro Evolution Soccer tournaments:

African Expansion 
PES Society as of 15 September 2020 announced its plans to expand into other countries on the African continent. The structure which would be similar to that of the existing South African PES Society organisation.

Structure 
PES Society, like other eSports clubs is constituted as an association.

The executive committee meets a minimum of twice a month, and requires a full report.

The office bearing staff comprises below founding individuals:

External links 
 

2013 establishments in South Africa
Esports teams established in 2013
Esports teams based in South Africa
Pro Evolution Soccer